The Flashing Blade is a French television serial made in the late 1960s. It was first broadcast in the UK on BBC children's television during the 1960s, with several re-runs throughout the 1970s. The British version of twelve 22 minutes episodes was created from the original four French 75-minute episodes.

The fictional story is based upon historical events during the War of the Mantuan Succession (1628–1631) between France and Spain and its allies. Charles Emmanuel I, Duke of Savoy, a supporter of Spain, laid siege to Casale, the capital of Montferrat on the Savoie (Savoy) border. Despite numerous attempts to scale the defences, the beleaguered garrison held out. The Savoy army was eventually defeated by a French relief force on 18 March 1629.

The castle of Casale, seen being besieged in the opening credits, was filmed at Château Gaillard in France.

Plot
The series revolves around the efforts of a dashing French spy to engineer the garrison's rescue. François, the Chevalier de Recci, and his servant Guillot are trapped in a besieged castle on the border between France and Spain. When the Spanish elite hear of a possible truce between France and Spain, some of them do not want a truce because the capture of the castle has greater strategic importance. They begin a bombardment in order to capture the French castle before any form of ceasefire agreement is signed. The garrison commander, General Thoiras, recruits François and Gullot to break through Spanish lines to get word of the attack to the French Army. The pair, with their superior swordplay and horsemanship, embark on a daring mission evading capture, enemy spies and pursuing soldiers to deliver their message. The series ends with the Chevalier bringing news of the peace conference's decision to the Spanish Forces surrounding the castle.

Cast

Production
Several cast members from The Flashing Blade appeared in similar serialised action productions for French children's TV.  Desert Crusader was virtually identical to The Flashing Blade but set in 12th-century Palestine during the Third Crusade. The Aeronauts was set in the present day and featured a couple of daring French Air Force Mirage fighter pilots.

Broadcast
It was perhaps most notorious for the fact that on its last two (conventional) broadcasts, the final episode lost vision through an apparent fault with the film stock; a considerable disappointment to its viewers after it had been running for many episodes over many weeks. The final few minutes of the last episode were later shown on Michael Aspel's "request a repeat" show Ask Aspel.

Theme tune 
The theme song was "Fight" by The Musketeers (written by Alex Masters), which was issued on a Philips single in 1969.

Re-dubbed parody 
In 1988, Andrew O'Connor, Kate Copstick, Bernadette Nolan and Terry Randall produced a spoof version which was broadcast on the Saturday morning children's show On the Waterfront. The scripts for the new comic soundtrack were written by Russell T Davies, who later went on to become an award-winning dramatist.
This team reunited in 1995 for a one-off episode that was broadcast on Children's BBC for Red Nose Day.
The parody version was followed by a re-run of the original series in the autumn of 1988.

Notes

External links

Theme tune lyrics, stills and more

1960s French television miniseries
French adventure television series
Cultural depictions of Cardinal Mazarin
1967 French television series debuts
1967 French television series endings
Office de Radiodiffusion Télévision Française original programming